Alessandro Piccolo (born October 17, 1980) is an Italian racing driver.

Career

Formula Renault
Piccolo finished fourth in the 2003 Formula Renault 2000 Italy championship, with 131 points.

Euro F3000
Piccolo competed in the Euro Formula 3000 championship in both 2001 and 2002, establishing himself as a frontrunner with one win, two pole positions and five podium finishes from 17 race starts.

Formula 3000
Piccolo moved to the International Formula 3000 series for 2003, where he was initially recruited by new team BCN Competicion to replace compatriot Valerio Scassellati after the first race. He impressed by outqualifying his more experienced team-mate Rob Nguyen in his second race in the category. However, he crashed heavily at the Casino corner of the Circuit de Monaco in practice for his third race with the team, damaging some of his vertebrae which put him out for most of the rest of the season. He eventually managed to return for the season finale at Monza, finishing the race in 11th place.

Racing record

Complete Euro Formula 3000 results
(key) (Races in bold indicate pole position; races in italics indicate fastest lap)

Complete International Formula 3000 results

References

Career statistics from driverdb.com. Retrieved on December 21, 2007.

External links
 

1980 births
Living people
Italian racing drivers
Italian Formula Renault 2.0 drivers
Auto GP drivers
International Formula 3000 drivers
Karting World Championship drivers
Piquet GP drivers
Euronova Racing drivers